Death and Taxes is a simulation video game by Leene Künnap, an Estonian indie game developer, and published through their company, Placeholder Gameworks on February 20, 2020. The game has the player take the role of a Grim Reaper, who must bureaucratically decide the fates of humans, specifically whether they will live or die. The game shares its ideology with the death-positive movement. On March 18, 2020, Placeholder Gameworks uploaded the game code under the MIT License on GitHub.

Gameplay 
The gameplay of Death and Taxes focuses on the work life of a Grim Reaper on an office job. The main objective of the player is to make difficult decisions to determine who could be saved from death and who is destined for certain doom, while keeping the game's fictional world in balance. Each human the player decides the fate of is given a short description about who they are; based on this, certain people living or dying can affect the world in various ways; the outcome of the game depends on the player's decisions. The player is given instructions on how they are supposed to make these decisions by their overseer, Fate, but the player may choose to ignore these instructions. Players can also customize their workspace and appearance with the money they earn. The game attempts to help people relate more easily to themes of death, to see them in a new perspective and to offer the player a chance for self-reflection.

Reception

Critical reception 
Death and Taxes was met with positive reception. Alice Bell of Rock Paper Shotgun called it "very funny" and praised the "really fun story running through [it]." Courtney Ehrenhofler of TechRaptor reviewed it as "a short, fun game with plenty of replay value." Many positive comparisons were drawn between the game and Lucas Pope's Papers, Please, which served as an inspiration for Death and Taxes.

Awards 
Death and Taxes won the third place at the 2018 Game Camps Kotka competition.

References

External links 
 
 

2020 video games
Commercial video games with freely available source code
Indie video games
Linux games
MacOS games
Nintendo Switch games
Video games about personifications of death
Puzzle video games
Simulation video games
Video games developed in Estonia
Video games with alternate endings
Windows games